Nathalie Alejandra Quezada Altamirano is a Chilean football striker, currently playing for Deportes Puerto Montt in the Chilean Championship. She played the 2011 Copa Libertadores's final.

She is a member of the Chile national team, taking part in the 2006 and 2010 South American Championships. As an Under-19 international she played the 2008 U-20 World Cup.

References

1989 births
Living people
Chilean women's footballers
Footballers from Santiago
Women's association football forwards
Colo-Colo (women) footballers
Chile women's international footballers
Competitors at the 2014 South American Games
South American Games silver medalists for Chile
South American Games medalists in football
Chilean women's futsal players